Hagikaze  was one of 19 s built for the Imperial Japanese Navy during the 1930s.

Design and description
The Kagerō class was an enlarged and improved version of the preceding . Their crew numbered 240 officers and enlisted men. The ships had two Kampon geared steam turbines, each driving one propeller shaft, using steam provided by three Kampon water-tube boilers.

The main armament of the Kagerō class consisted of six Type 3  guns in three twin-gun turrets, one superfiring pair aft and one turret forward of the superstructure. They were built with four Type 96  anti-aircraft guns in two twin-gun mounts, but more of these guns were added over the course of the war. The ships were also armed with eight  torpedo tubes for the oxygen-fueled Type 93 "Long Lance" torpedo in two quadruple traversing mounts; one reload was carried for each tube. Their anti-submarine weapons comprised 16 depth charges.

Construction and career
Participating in the Battle of Midway, the heavily damaged aircraft carrier  was scuttled by Hagikazes two torpedoes,  Kaga being fatally damaged by US aircraft from  during the battle.

Notes

References

External links
 CombinedFleet.com: Kagero-class destroyers
 CombinedFleet.com: Hagikaze history

Hagikaze
World War II destroyers of Japan
Ships of the Battle of Midway
Shipwrecks in the Solomon Sea
1940 ships
Maritime incidents in August 1943
Ships built by Uraga Dock Company